Medicine Township is a township in Mercer County, in the U.S. state of Missouri.

Medicine Township was established in 1848, and most likely took its name from a creek of the same name within its borders.

References

Townships in Missouri
Townships in Mercer County, Missouri